The Great Northern Railway Tavern is a Grade II listed public house at High Street, Hornsey, London.

It was built in about 1900.

References

Grade II listed buildings in the London Borough of Haringey
Grade II listed pubs in London
Hornsey
Pubs in the London Borough of Haringey